The 2022–23 Feyenoord Basketball season is the 69th season in the existence of the club and the 5th as Feyenoord Basketball.

On June 10, 2022, coach Toon van Helfteren extended his contract.

Roster

Depth chart

Transcations

In 

|}

Out

|}

References

Feyenoord
Feyenoord
Feyenoord Basketball seasons